This is a list of official trips made by Paolo Gentiloni, who served as the 57th Prime Minister of Italy from 12 December 2016 until 1 June 2018.

Summary of international trips

2017

2018

References 

Gentiloni, Paolo
Foreign relations of Italy
Gentiloni, Paolo